The 164th New York State Legislature, consisting of the New York State Senate and the New York State Assembly, met from January 6, 1943, to October 30, 1944, during the first and second years of Thomas E. Dewey's governorship, in Albany.

Background
Under the provisions of the New York Constitution of 1894, re-apportioned in 1917, and amended in 1937, 51 Senators and 150 assemblymen were elected in single-seat districts for two-year terms. The senatorial districts consisted either of one or more entire counties; or a contiguous area within a single county. The counties which were divided into more than one senatorial district were New York (nine districts), Kings (eight), Bronx (three), Erie (three), Monroe (two), Queens (two) and Westchester (two). The Assembly districts were made up of contiguous area, all within the same county.

At this time there were two major political parties: the Republican Party and the Democratic Party. The American Labor Party, the Communist Party, the Socialist Party and the Socialist Labor Party (running under the name of "Industrial Government Party") also nominated tickets.

Elections
The New York state election, 1942, was held on November 3. Thomas E. Dewey and Thomas W. Wallace were elected Governor and Lieutenant Governor, both Republicans. Of the other four statewide elective offices, three were also carried by Republicans, and one by a Democrat with American Labor endorsement. The approximate party strength at this election, as expressed by the vote for Governor, was: Republicans 2,149,000; Democrats 1,501,000; American Labor 404,000; Communists 45,000; Socialists 22,000; and Industrial Government 3,500.

All four women legislators—State Senator Rhoda Fox Graves (Rep.), of Gouverneur; and Assemblywomen Jane H. Todd (Rep.), of Tarrytown; Edith C. Cheney (Rep.), of Corning; and Mary A. Gillen (Dem.), of Brooklyn—were re-elected.

Lt. Gov. Thomas W. Wallace died on July 17, 1943.

The New York state election, 1943, was held on November 2. Temporary President of the State Senate Joe R. Hanley (Rep.) was elected Lieutenant Governor; and Thomas D. Thacher (Rep.) was elected unopposed to succeed himself as Judge of the New York Court of Appeals. Two vacancies in the State Senate and seven vacancies in the Assembly were filled.

Sessions
The Legislature met for the first regular session (the 166th) at the State Capitol in Albany on January 6, 1943; and adjourned on March 26.

Oswald D. Heck (Rep.) was re-elected Speaker.

Joe R. Hanley (Rep.) was re-elected Temporary President of the State Senate.

The Legislature finally re-apportioned the Senate and Assembly districts. Re-apportionment was overdue since the figures of the 1925 state census had been published, but the Assembly, the Senate and the Governor had been at odds over the question ever since. Now, for the first time since then, both Houses of the Legislature had majorities of the same party of which the Governor was a member, all Republican. The Re-Apportionment Bill was introduced in the Legislature on March 8; and signed by Gov. Dewey on April 8. The re-apportionment was contested in the courts by the Democrats, but was upheld unanimously by the New York Court of Appeals on November 18, 1943.

The total number of state senators was increased to 56. Chautauqua, Dutchess, Monroe, Oneida, Rensselaer, St. Lawrence, Schenectady and Steuben counties lost one Assembly seat each; and New York County lost seven seats. Kings and Westchester counties gained one seat each; Nassau County gained two; Bronx County gained five; and Queens County gained six seats.

The Legislature met for the second regular session (the 167th) at the State Capitol in Albany on January 5, 1944; and adjourned on March 18.

Benjamin F. Feinberg (Rep.) was elected Temporary President of the State Senate.

The Legislature met for a special session at the State Capitol in Albany on October 30, 1944. This session was held to enact an extension of the voting time on the next election day, and to increase the pay for election workers.

State Senate

Districts

Members
The asterisk (*) denotes members of the previous Legislature who continued in office as members of this Legislature. Floyd E. Anderson changed from the Assembly to the Senate at the beginning of this Legislature. Assemblymen John V. Downey and James A. Corcoran were elected to fill vacancies in the Senate.

Note: For brevity, the chairmanships omit the words "...the Committee on (the)..."

Employees
 Clerk: William S. King
 Assistant Clerk: Fred J. Slater, died on August 20, 1943

State Assembly

Assemblymen

Note: For brevity, the chairmanships omit the words "...the Committee on (the)..."

Employees
 Clerk: Ansley B. Borkowski

Notes

Sources
 You and the Legislature in The State Employee (January 1943, Vol. 12, No. 1, pg. 24, 25 and 34)
 Members of the New York Senate (1940s) at Political Graveyard
 Members of the New York Assembly (1940s) at Political Graveyard
 LEGISLATIVE MIRROR, weekly newsletter by Assemblyman Wheeler Milmoe, in the Madison County Leader, of Morrisville, on January 20, 1944

164
1943 in New York (state)
1944 in New York (state)
1943 U.S. legislative sessions
1944 U.S. legislative sessions